Penn State Schuylkill is a Commonwealth Campus of the Pennsylvania State University in Schuylkill Haven, Pennsylvania.

History 
The Schuylkill campus was originally chartered in 1934 and was located in Pottsville, approximately six miles (10 km) north of the current campus. Classes were originally held in rented space, and laboratory facilities for science students were shared with an area high school. After World War II, the college began to grow, and in 1953, they began offering their first full associate degree programs. In the 1960s, the nearly 500 student body was outgrowing its Pottsville facilities, and the college looked to relocate. In 1967, the campus was relocated to a 39-acre tract of land just outside of Schuylkill Haven, former site of the county almshouse.

The campus saw continued growth during the 1970s, including expanding infrastructure and the addition of new academic programs and activities. In the fall of 1970 a new associate degree program in the burgeoning field of Computer Science was added to the curriculum. Penn State Schuylkill continued to keep up with emerging technology throughout that decade and into the next with academic programing designed to meet the needs of students and the surrounding community.

In the early 1990s the campus' first baccalaureate degree students began to graduate and the capital campaign for the new library initiated at the end of the previous decade bore fruit when the 22,600 square foot Ciletti Memorial Library opened in December 1994.

Throughout the 2000s, Penn State Schuylkill continued to grow to meet the educational needs of twenty-first century students. The campus administers a $1 million scholarship endowment, and with over 90% of students receiving some form of financial assistance, Penn State Schuylkill continues its tradition of helping to make a Penn State education affordable and attainable.

In fall 2017, Washington Monthly named Penn State Schuylkill a Top 25 Northeast College for value (Best Bang for the Buck), as well as the best value public university in the state of Pennsylvania.

Academics 
Penn State Schuylkill offers ten baccalaureate and four associate degrees as well as nine academic minors. Students also have the option to participate in the 2+2 degree plan, where they can begin any of 275+ majors at the Schuylkill campus and complete the remainder of their degree at another Penn State campus, including University Park.

Athletics
The Penn State–Schuylkill athletic teams are called the Nittany Lions. The university is a member of the National Association of Intercollegiate Athletics (NAIA), primarily competing as an NAIA Independent within the Continental Athletic Conference since the 2018–19 academic year. The Nittany Lions also compete as a member of the United States Collegiate Athletic Association (USCAA), primarily competing in the Pennsylvania State University Athletic Conference (PSUAC) since the 2008–09 academic year.

Penn State–Schuylkill competes in 11 intercollegiate varsity sports: Men's sports include baseball, basketball, cross country and track & field; while women's sports include basketball, cross country, soccer, softball, track & field and volleyball; and co-ed sports include golf.

Gallery

References

External links 

 Official website
 Official athletics website

Pennsylvania State University colleges
Educational institutions established in 1934
Universities and colleges in Schuylkill County, Pennsylvania
USCAA member institutions
1934 establishments in Pennsylvania
Schuylkill